Elliot Clarke Stuart (born 1946) is a former English international badminton player.

Badminton career 
Stuart was a winner of the All England Open Badminton Championships. He won the 1975 All England Badminton Championships mixed doubles with Nora Gardner.

Stuart competed in the 1974 British Commonwealth Games in Christchurch winning the gold medal, in the men's doubles with Derek Talbot and a bronze medal, in the mixed doubles with Susan Whetnall. He also won a bronze medal in the men's doubles at the 1972 Summer Olympics when the sport was a demonstration sport.

Personal life 
Stuart studied metallurgy at Newcastle University before working for Barclays Bank from 1968 until the mid 1990s.

Achievement

International Tournament 

Men's doubles

References

External links 

English male badminton players
Commonwealth Games gold medallists for England
Commonwealth Games bronze medallists for England
Commonwealth Games medallists in badminton
1946 births
Living people
Badminton players at the 1974 British Commonwealth Games
Badminton players at the 1972 Summer Olympics
Medallists at the 1974 British Commonwealth Games